Into Darkness is the first and only full-length album of American doom metal band Winter. The album was released in 1990 by Future Shock Records.The first CD re-issue by Nuclear Blast America (distributed by Relapse in the US) in 1992 had only the "Into Darkness" tracks. It was later re-issued by Nuclear Blast as a digipak with an altered front cover and the Eternal Frost EP as bonus tracks. The album was re-released again, with no bonus tracks, by Southern Lord on April 12, 2011, on black and white vinyl as a gate fold LP with booklet.

July 8, 2013: The Village Voice blogger Jason Roche lists Into Darkness as #14 in the top 20 hardcore and metal albums to come out of NYC.

Decibel magazine ranked the album at #13 in the Top 100 Doom Metal Albums of All Time Special Issue.

Track listing

References

Winter (American band) albums
1990 debut albums